Roccantica is a  (municipality) in the Province of Rieti in the Italian region of Latium, located about  northeast of Rome and about  southwest of Rieti.

The Gothic churches of San Valentin and Santa Caterina are notable; the latter houses 14th-century frescoes.

References

External links
 Official website

Cities and towns in Lazio